Monday is a surname. Notable people with the surname include:

Carl Monday, American television reporter
Edigold Monday, Ugandan businessman
Jon Monday (born 1947), American record producer
Kenny Monday (born 1961), American wrestler
Osborne Monday (born 1985), Kenyan footballer
Rick Monday (born 1945), American baseball player and broadcaster
Smoke Monday (born 1999), American football player